Boronia kalumburuensis is a plant in the citrus family Rutaceae and is endemic to the Kalumburu area of Western Australia. It is an erect or sprawling shrub with many branches, pinnate leaves and white to pink four-petalled flowers with the sepals longer and wider than the petals.

Description
Its branches and leaves are covered with star-like hairs. The sepals and petals are white or creamy white, the sepals longer and wider than the petals. Flowering occurs from May to July.

Taxonomy and naming
Boronia kalumburuensis was first formally described in 1997 by Marco F. Duretto from a specimen collected near the Kulumburu airstrip, and the description was published in  Nuytsia. The specific epithet (kalumburuensis) refers to the community where this species is found. The ending -ensis is a Latin suffix "denoting place", "locality" or "country".

Distribution and habitat
Boronia kalumburuensis grows on sandstone and quartzite and is only known from the Kalumburu area in the Kimberley region of far northern Western Australia.

Conservation
This boronia is classified as "Priority Three" by the Western Australian Government Department of Parks and Wildlife meaning that it is poorly known and known from only a few locations but is not under imminent threat.

References 

kalumburuensis
Flora of Western Australia
Plants described in 1997
Taxa named by Marco Duretto